Frederick A. Shannon (May 4, 1921 in Mount Pleasant, Iowa – August 31, 1965 in Los Angeles County, California) was a U.S. herpetologist and medical doctor.

He was born the son of Fred Albert Shannon and Edna M. (Jones) Shannon.

In 1939, Shannon moved to Champaign, Illinois, and began studying zoology at the University of Illinois, where he got a B.A. in zoology in 1943. He then started studying medicine and got an M.D. in 1947. He practiced for one year at the St. Joseph's Hospital in Phoenix, Arizona, before going back to Illinois for some post-graduate herpetology work. In 1949 he moved to Wickenburg, Arizona.

Between 1951 and 1953, Shannon was sent as a lieutenant to Korea, where although on active service in a war zone he still found opportunities to collect many reptile specimens. Back in the U.S., he published many articles on venomous snake bites, venomology, and herpetology. From 1956 on, he collected specimens mainly in Mexico.

He died from the bite of a Mojave rattlesnake he had attempted to catch.

Shannon is commemorated in the scientific names of two lizards: Sceloporus shannonorum and Urosaurus graciosus shannoni. The specific name, shannonorum, which is genitive plural, honors both Shannon and his wife.

References

External links
 

American herpetologists
1921 births
1965 deaths
Deaths due to snake bites
American military personnel of the Korean War
Deaths due to animal attacks in the United States
United States Army officers
Physicians from Arizona
People from Mount Pleasant, Iowa
University of Illinois Urbana-Champaign alumni
People from Wickenburg, Arizona
20th-century American zoologists
Military personnel from Iowa